This is a list of notable people who died of starvation:

See also
List of deaths from anorexia nervosa
Angola
Famine relief
Franklin expedition
Great Leap Forward
History of Sudan
Great Irish Famine
Little Ice Age
North Korea
Siege of Leningrad
Sokushinbutsu
2005 Malawi food crisis
2008 Central Asia energy crisis
Theresienstadt concentration camp
Lists of people by cause of death

Notes

External links
Hunger and Deaths in Brazil

 
Starvation